This article contains information about the literary events and publications of 1772.

Events
March – Gottfried August Bürger obtains a magistracy and is reconciled with his family.
May 7 – The Stadsschouwburg theatre in Amsterdam is destroyed by fire.
June
At Marseilles, the Marquis de Sade embarks on an orgy, as a result of which he is convicted in absentia of sodomy and poisoning and receives a death sentence; he escapes.
Charles Burney tours Europe, researching for his History of Music.
September 12 – The Göttinger Hainbund of German poets is formed at a midnight ritual in an oaken grove.
November 10 – The wife of poet Pedro Correia Garção obtains an order for his release from prison, the very day of his death.
November 28 – Publication of the Bible in the Manx language is completed.
unknown dates
Thomas Paine produces his first published work, a political article entitled Case of the Officers of Excise.
Hannah More arrives in London.
An Armenian language press is set up in Chennai, India.

New books

Fiction
Elizabeth Bonhôte – The Rambles of Mr Frankly, Published by his Sister
Jacques Cazotte – Le Diable Amoureux
Robert Fergusson – The Daft Days
Sarah Scott – The Test of Filial Duty
David Williams – Letter to David Garrick

Drama
György Bessenyei – Ágis tragédiája
Richard Cumberland – The Fashionable Lover
Samuel Foote – The Nabob
Vicente Garcia de la Huerta – Raquel
David Garrick – The Irish Widow
Gotthold Lessing – Emilia Galotti
Louis-Sébastien Mercier
Le faux ami (The False Friend)
Jean Hennuyer, évêque de Lisieux (written)
Arthur Murphy – The Grecian Daughter

Poetry

Mark Akenside – Poems
Thomas Chatterton – The Execution of Sir Charles Bawdin
William Jones – Poems, Consisting Chiefly of Translations from the Asiatick Languages
William Kenrick – Love in the Suds
William Mason – The English Garden
Christopher Smart – Hymns, for the Amusement of Children
George Alexander Stevens – Songs

Non-fiction
Alphabetum grandonico-malabaricum sive samscrudonicum (with a preface by Giovanni Cristofano Amaduzzi)
The Encyclopédie in 28 volumes by Diderot, d'Alembert, and many others
Moses Browne – The Excellency of the Knowledge of Jesus Christ
José Cadalso – Los eruditos a la violeta
William Chambers – A Dissertation on Oriental Gardening
Junius (possibly Philip Francis) – Junius: Stat Nominis Umbra
Francis Grose – The Antiquities of England and Wales
Johann Gottfried Herder – Abhandlung über den Ursprung der Sprache (Treatise on the Origin of Language)
Richard Hurd – An Introduction to the Study of Prophecies...
Carsten Niebuhr – Beschreibung von Arabien
Joseph Priestley – The History and Present State of Discoveries Relating to Vision, Light, and Colours
Francis Stoughton Sullivan (died 1766) – An Historical Treatise on the Feudal Law, and the Constitution and Laws of England
Catherine Talbot – Essays on Various Subjects
Wilhelm Abraham Teller – Wörterbuch des Neuen Testamentes zur Erklärung der christlichen Lehre (Dictionary of the New Testament for the Explanation of Christian Doctrine)

Births
January 15 – James Ballantyne, Scottish editor and publisher (died 1833)
March 10 – Karl Wilhelm Friedrich Schlegel, German poet, literary critic, philosopher and philologist (died 1829)
April 11 – Manuel José Quintana, Spanish poet (died 1857)
May 2 – Novalis (Georg Philipp Friedrich Freiherr von Hardenberg), German poet and philosopher (died 1801)
August 29 – Sarah Burney, English novelist (died 1844)
September 27 – Sándor Kisfaludy, Hungarian poet (died 1844)
October 21 – Samuel Taylor Coleridge, English poet (died 1834)
November 17 – Marc-Antoine Madeleine Désaugiers, French dramatist (died 1827)
November 28 – Johann Gottfried Jakob Hermann, German classical commentator and philologist (died 1848)
December 6
John Carr, English travel writer and lawyer (died 1832)
Henry Cary, Gibraltar-born Irish author, editor and translator (died 1844)
unknown date – Maria Riddell, West Indies-born poet, naturalist and travel writer resident in Scotland (died 1808)
probable – Charlotte Dacre, English Gothic novelist (died 1825)

Deaths
March 26 – Charles Pinot Duclos, French novelist and encyclopedist (born 1704)
March 29 – Emanuel Swedenborg, Swedish philosopher (born 1688)
May 22 – Durastante Natalucci, Italian historian (born 1687)
June – Thomas Whately, English politician and writer (born 1726)
June 18 – Johann Ulrich von Cramer, German philosopher (born 1706)
October 7 – John Woolman, American abolitionist author (smallpox, born 1720)
October 10 – William Wilkie, Scottish poet (ague, born 1721)
November 10 – Pedro Correia Garção, Portuguese poet (born 1724)
unknown dates
Thomas Hawkins, English editor and cleric (born 1729)
Margareta Momma, Swedish editor and writer (born 1702)

References

 
Years of the 18th century in literature